The Seaboard System Railroad, Inc.  was a US Class I railroad that operated from 1982 to 1986.

Since the late 1960s, Seaboard Coast Line Industries had operated the Seaboard Coast Line and its sister railroads—notably the Louisville & Nashville and Clinchfield—as the "Family Lines System". In 1980, SCLI merged with the Chessie System to create the holding company CSX Corporation; two years later, CSX merged the Family Lines railroads to create the Seaboard System Railroad. 

In 1986, Seaboard renamed itself CSX Transportation, which absorbed the Chessie System's two major railroads the following year.

History
The Seaboard System's roots trace back to SCL Industries, a holding company created in 1968 that combined the Seaboard Coast Line's subsidiary railroads into one entity. In 1969, SCL was renamed Seaboard Coast Line Industries. Known as the Family Lines System from 1972-1982, to better compete with the Southern Railway System. this entity adopted its own logo and colors, but each railroad maintained its own identity. Over time, this caused confusion among customers. In comparison to the neighboring Chessie System, which had four railroads, the Family Lines had six railroads. In 1971 SCL bought out the remaining shares and made the Louisville & Nashville a subsidiary.

On November 1, 1980, Seaboard Coast Lines Industries and Chessie System merged under the holding company CSX Corporation. Over the following seven years, the Chessie and Seaboard's various railroads were gradually merged into one. 

The first step came on December 29, 1982, when the Seaboard Coast Line and Louisville & Nashville (under the Family Lines entity) were merged to form the Seaboard System Railroad, Inc.

Considered as a "temporary railroad", the Seaboard System quickly began to merge the smaller railroads that were owned under the Family Lines System entity. This included the Georgia Railroad and the Clinchfield Railroad (1983), South Carolina Pacific Railway (April 30, 1984), Louisville, Henderson & St. Louis Railway (July 1984), Gainesville Midland (1985), Atlanta & West Point Railroad (June 1986) and the Columbia, Newberry & Laurens (June 1986).  These mergers simplified equipment and management alongside the Chessie System railroads (Chesapeake & Ohio, Baltimore & Ohio, Western Maryland). 

The process began its culmination when Seaboard renamed itself CSX Transportation on July 1, 1986. On April 30, 1987, the Baltimore & Ohio Railroad was merged into the Chesapeake & Ohio. Finally, on August 31, 1987, the Chesapeake & Ohio (still under the Chessie System entity for corporate reasons) was merged into CSX Transportation. All the major railroads under CSX Corporation were now one company. (The Western Railway of Alabama would remain an operating subsidiary until December 2002, when it was finally merged into CSX.)

Equipment colors and painting
Even before the creation of the Seaboard System, locomotives began to receive a simplified paint scheme of the Family Lines. However, only the iron-grey, red, and yellow colors were recycled, in combination with a completely redesigned logo featuring a coupled variation font of ITC Eras Demi. The first locomotive to be decorated with the new Seaboard System paint scheme was Uceta GP16 #4802 in October 1982. Because the merger did not occur until December, locomotives after October 1982 were to receive the Seaboard System paint scheme with the existing railroad's reporting marks applied.

When the merger officially took effect on January 1, 1983, all former reporting marks were to be either removed or patched with SBD initials. Shortly before taking delivery of the L&N specified EMD SD50's, Seaboard adopted a Swis721 type font for reporting marks and numbers, instead of the customized Seaboard Coast Line lettering seen on pre-1983 repaints. To simplify its locomotive roster and meet Chessie System specifications, Seaboard introduced a numbering system that partially became meshed within the Chessie System locomotive fleet, and removed any existing Mars Lights or Gyralights from locomotives. Any new locomotives purchased by Seaboard would be built to meet Chessie specifications; of which only three, EMD SD50, EMD MP15T and GE B36-7, were ordered.

Operating divisions 
This section lists the operating divisions of the Seaboard System as of January 1, 1985:
 Atlanta
 Birmingham
 Corbin
 Evansville
 Florence
 Jacksonville
 Louisville
 Mobile
 Nashville
 Raleigh
 Savannah
 Tampa

References 

CSX Transportation Family Merger Tree
UCETA GP16 roster
UCETA GP16 paint
EMD "40" Series models
EMD "50" Series models
GE B36-7 Roster

 
Predecessors of CSX Transportation
Defunct Florida railroads
Defunct Georgia (U.S. state) railroads
Defunct North Carolina railroads
Defunct South Carolina railroads
Defunct Virginia railroads
Former Class I railroads in the United States
Standard gauge railways in the United States
Railway companies established in 1982
Railway companies disestablished in 1986
Defunct Alabama railroads
Defunct Ohio railroads
Defunct Missouri railroads
Defunct Illinois railroads
Defunct Kentucky railroads
Defunct Indiana railroads
Defunct Tennessee railroads
Defunct Louisiana railroads
Defunct Mississippi railroads
1982 establishments in the United States